Dance Se Puder (Dance If You Can) is a Brazilian talent show, presented as a segment on Programa Eliana, from the SBT network. Several celebrities compete dancing various music styles. They perform to a panel usually consisting of three judges. Viewers can vote and eliminate a participant per round.

Judges 
Contestants are given points from 0 to 10 by three judges, including the choreographers Jaime Arôxa and Ivan Santos, which is present in almost all stages of the competition, along with a guest. At the end of the competition, the winner will take a cash prize of R$50,000.

Format 
Two groups with five members each compete. Each contestant has to dance to a song chosen randomly and each has a week to prepare a dance performance. The two groups don't compete in the same week. The Supimpas show up on a Sunday and the Five Stars are presented in the following Sunday. Each contestant receives a score on a scale from 0 to 10 by the three judges. The three scores are calculated and the results of each group member are added together to form the final score. After the presentation and scores of the Five Stars, it's time to know which team scored higher. The team that has scored the most points is the winner, and all members are safe from elimination. The loser team is in the hot seat and the teammate who scored the less is automatically up for elimination. Plus, the loser team have to choose a second teammate of their own to face the audience's preference. The vote is set by text message.

In the second round, it was decided that one of the members of the Five Stars would have their points disregarded so that the average score of the teams would be balanced. Pedro Henrique was chosen, ironically being the one who had more points for his team in that round. If the Five Stars lost because of Pedro Henrique, he could not be placed in the bottom two since he won invincibility.

After the elimination of Jean in the third round, the Supimpas was depleted due to two consecutive eliminations. So the solution was move a member of the Five Stars to the Supimpas. Gabriel was chosen and a random song was chosen for him for the fourth round.

In the fourth round the teams merged.

Contestants 

 The contestant won Dance Se Puder.
 The contestant was the runner-up of Dance Se Puder.
 The contestant won with their team and had the highest score. / The contestant had the highest score and won individually.
 The contestant was one of the best individually but didn't win.
 The contestant was in the winning team.
 The contestant won entry back into the competition.
 The contestant was one of the worst but was not in the bottom two.
 The contestant was in the bottom two.
 The contestant was eliminated.
 The contestant came back for a chance to win re-entry into the competition but lost.
 The contestant did not participate in this episode.
Since Pedro Henrique's score was disregarded, Gabriel became the one with more points on round 2.
Amanda had the second-highest score in her group on the first round. Still, she was the most voted in her group and was placed in the bottom two. This caused controversy online.
Raissa and Pedro Henrique are the only contestants to reach the final three without being in the bottom two.

Songs assigned 

 Voted the best performance of the season by the audience.

Audience's vote

References

2016 Brazilian television seasons